Lorrie Lynch was the senior editor and personalities columnist for USA Weekend magazine through 2009.

Biography
Lynch has a B.A. in Journalism from Central Michigan University, where she was editor of the campus newspaper, CM LIFE.

She interviewed entertainment figures and wrote the "Who's News" column in the Sunday magazine.  Lynch moved to USA Weekend from USA Today, where she was a founding staff member. As a reporter in the News section, she covered national stories and Washington politics. As the paper's San Francisco bureau chief, she covered western issues and reported the beginning of the nation's AIDS crisis. As an editor in the "Life" section, she was responsible for the paper's daily celebrity coverage.
Lynch also worked for newspapers in Port Huron, Ypsilanti, Traverse City, Mount Pleasant, and Battle Creek, Michigan. She also worked for The Sacramento Bee and The Marin County Independent Journal, both in California.

Lynch told a Michigan Interscholastic Press Association press conference in August 2007 that she began thinking about writing in second grade because she would get encouragement from her grandmother about writing when she wrote letters.

Lynch also is the author of Exploring Journalism and the Media (2009).

References

Living people
Year of birth missing (living people)
Central Michigan University alumni
American women non-fiction writers
21st-century American women